80 kDa MCM3-associated protein is a protein that in humans is encoded by the MCM3AP gene.

Function 

The minichromosome maintenance protein 3 (MCM3) is one of the MCM proteins essential for the initiation of DNA replication. The protein encoded by this gene is an MCM3 binding protein. It was reported to have phosphorylation-dependent DNA-primase activity, which was up-regulated in antigen immunization induced germinal center. This protein was demonstrated to be an acetyltransferase that acetylates MCM3 and plays a role in DNA replication. The mutagenesis of a nuclear localization signal of MCM3 affects the binding of this protein with MCM3, suggesting that this protein may also facilitate MCM3 nuclear localization.

Interactions 

MCM3AP has been shown to interact with:
 MCM3  and
 TRIB3.

References

Further reading

External links 
 PDBe-KB provides an overview of all the structure information available in the PDB for Human Germinal-center associated nuclear protein (MCM3AP)